Veppadai is a small town located on the (Erode-Salem main road) in Komarapalayam taluk, Namakkal district, Tamil Nadu, India.   It is at the junction of (Tiruchengode to Komarapalayam road) and (Pallipalayam to Sankari road), 13 km from Tiruchengode, 9 km from Komarapalayam, and 9 km from Erode.

Its currently surrounded by many textile mills and Veppadai has become a busy small town with 24 hour transport facility.

Neighborhoods
Pallipalayam
Erode junction
Tiruchengode
Erode Bus terminus
Komarapalayam
Sankagiri
Bhavani.

References

Villages in Namakkal district